In geometry, a polygon is traditionally a plane figure that is bounded by a finite chain of straight line segments closing in a loop to form a closed chain. These segments are called its edges or sides, and the points where two of the edges meet are the polygon's vertices (singular: vertex) or corners.

The word polygon comes from Late Latin polygōnum (a noun), from Greek πολύγωνον (polygōnon/polugōnon), noun use of neuter of πολύγωνος (polygōnos/polugōnos, the masculine adjective), meaning "many-angled". Individual polygons are named (and sometimes classified) according to the number of sides, combining a Greek-derived numerical prefix with the suffix -gon, e.g. pentagon, dodecagon. The triangle, quadrilateral and nonagon are exceptions, although the regular forms trigon, tetragon, and enneagon are sometimes encountered as well.

Greek numbers
Polygons are primarily named by prefixes from Ancient Greek numbers.

Systematic polygon names 

To construct the name of a polygon with more than 20 and fewer than 100 edges, combine the prefixes as follows. The "kai" connector is not included by some authors.

Extending the system up to 999 is expressed with these prefixes; the names over 99 no longer correspond to how they are actually expressed in Greek.

List of n-gons by Greek numerical prefixes

See also 
 Platonic solid
 Dice
 List of polygons, polyhedra and polytopes
Circle
Ellipses

 polygon
 Shapes

References

 NAMING POLYGONS
 Benjamin Franklin Finkel, A Mathematical Solution Book Containing Systematic Solutions to Many of the Most Difficult Problems, 1888

 
Polygons